Palaichori Oreinis is a village located in the Nicosia District of Cyprus on the E 903 road. 
The village  stands at an altitude of 930 m. Palaichori Oreinis is separated by Palaichori Morphou by the Serrache River.  The two villages are known collectively as Palaichori.

The village contains a 16th-century church, Metamorfosis tou Sotiros. The church is one of the ten Painted Churches in the Troödos Region, which were inscribed as a UNESCO World Heritage Site in 1985 because of their outstanding frescoes and testimony to the history of Byzantine rule in Cyprus.

References

External links
 
palaichori.com Guide to the Village of Palaichori 

Communities in Nicosia District